Events in the year 1703 in Norway.

Incumbents
Monarch: Frederick IV

Births
29 September – Baltzer Fleischer, civil servant and county governor (died 1767).

See also

References